The Scania 100 Tournament was a minor international men's football tournament organised by Swedish Football Association. It was held in Sweden, from 12 to 16 June 1991. It served both as a warm up tournament one year prior to the Euro 1992 and as a commemoration of the 100th anniversary of Scania.

Participant teams
The following teams participated in the tournament.

 Sweden
 Denmark
 Italy
 Soviet Union

Matches

Match rules
90 minutes.
Penalty shoot-out after a draw in 90 minutes.
Maximum of three substitutions.

Bracket

Semi-finals

Third place play-off

Final

Winners

Goalscorers
3 goals
 Tomas Brolin
2 goals
 Martin Dahlin
 Igor Korneev
1 goal
 Kennet Andersson
 Ruggiero Rizzitelli
 Gianluca Vialli
 Giuseppe Giannini
 Sergei Yuran
 Dmitri Kuznetsov

External links

RSSSF page
1991 in Swedish football
June 1991 sports events in Europe
Sports competitions in Norrköping
Sports competitions in Solna
Sports competitions in Gothenburg
Sports competitions in Malmö
1990s in Malmö
1990s in Gothenburg